The National Football League champions, prior to the merger between the National Football League (NFL) and American Football League (AFL) in 1970, were determined by two different systems. The National Football League was established on September 17, 1920, as the American Professional Football Association (APFA). The APFA changed its name in 1922 to the National Football League, which it has retained ever since. From 1921 to 1931, the APFA/NFL determined its champion by overall win–loss record, with no playoff games; ties were not counted in the winning percentage total. The APFA did not keep records of the 1920 season; they declared the Akron Pros, who finished the season with an 8–0–3 (8 wins, 0 losses, 3 ties) record, as the league's first champions by a vote of the owners. The Canton Bulldogs won two straight championships from 1922 to 1923, and the Green Bay Packers won three in a row from 1929 to 1931.  

The 1932 NFL season resulted in a tie for first place between the Chicago Bears and Portsmouth Spartans, and could not be resolved by the typical win–loss system. To settle the tie, a playoff game was played; Chicago won the game and the championship. The following year, the NFL split into two divisions, and the winner of each division would play in the NFL Championship Game. In 1967, the NFL and the rival AFL agreed to merge, effective following the 1969 season; as part of this deal, the NFL champion from 1966 to 1969 would play the AFL champion in an AFL–NFL World Championship Game in each of the four seasons before the completed merger. The NFL Championship Game was ended after the 1969 season, succeeded by the NFC Championship Game. The champions of that game play the champions of the AFC Championship Game in the Super Bowl to determine the NFL champion.

The Chicago Bears won a total of eight titles, and the Cleveland Browns, Detroit Lions, and New York Giants each won four. The Bears recorded the largest victory in a championship game, defeating the Washington Redskins 73–0 in the 1940 NFL Championship Game; six other title games ended in a shutout as well. The Philadelphia Eagles recorded two consecutive shutouts in 1948 and 1949. New York City hosted the most championship games (eight), while the highest-attended title game was the 1955 NFL Championship Game, where 85,693 fans showed up in Los Angeles to watch the Browns beat the Rams 38–14.

APFA/NFL champions (1920–1932)
Champion determined by win–loss percentage. The number in parentheses indicates the number of championships the franchise had won to that point.

Note: disputed champions are listed with an asterisk (*)

NFL champions (1933–1969)
Numbers in parentheses in the table indicate the number of times that team won the NFL championship as of the championship game.

Total championships won (1920–1969)

See also
NFC Championship Game
AFC Championship Game

Notes

Notes

Footnotes

References

20th century-related lists
National Football League Championship games
Champions
National Football League playoffs
Super Bowl lists
National Football League records and achievements